Vojin is a masculine given name or surname of Slavic origin. It may refer to:

Vojin Bakić (1915–1992), prominent Croatian sculptor of Serbian descent
Vojin Božović (1913–1983), Montenegrin, Yugoslav international, football player and manager
Vojin Ćetković (born 1971), Serbian actor
Vojin Jelić (1921–2004), Croatian Serb writer and poet
Vojin Lazarević (born 1942), Montenegrin striker
Vojin Menkovič (born 1982), Serbian handball player
Vojin Popović, known as Vojvoda Vuk (1881–1916), Serbian voivode (military commander)
Vojin Prole (born 1976), retired Serbian football goalkeeper
Vojin Rakić (born 1967), political scientist and philosopher
Vojvoda Vojin (1322–1347), Serb voivode (military commander, Duke) and magnate (velikaš)

See also
Vojany
Vojens
Vojihna
Vojinović (disambiguation)
Vojinovac
Vojinović noble family

Slavic masculine given names
Serbian masculine given names